John Dobson is the name of:

 John Dobson (architect) (1787–1865), British architect
 John Dobson (amateur astronomer) (1915–2014), popularizer of astronomy and the Dobsonian telescope
 John Dobson (Canadian politician) (1824–1907), Canadian senator
 John Dobson (Northern Ireland politician) (1929–2009), Northern Irish politician
 John Dobson (priest) (born 1964), British priest and Dean of Ripon
 John Dobson (rugby union coach), South African rugby union coach
 John Dobson (rugby union, born 1886) (1886–1936), Scotland international rugby union player
 John Dobson (academic) (1690–1724), warden of New College, Oxford